In the Spanish language there are some verbs with irregular participles. There are also verbs with both regular and irregular participles, in which the irregular form is most used as an adjective, while the regular form tends to appear after haber to form compound perfect tenses.

Agreement 

When a participle is used as adjective, it must agree in gender and number with the noun modified:

Verbs with irregular participles 

1The roots -scribir, -facer, and -solver appear only in prefixed forms, e.g. inscribir, satisfacer, absolver.  The adjective suelto means 'loose, free'.
2The variant -scripto is used in Argentina, Paraguay, and Uruguay.

Verbs derived from the stems in the table above have participles similar to those of their "parent" verbs — e.g. devolver → devuelto, componer → compuesto. Note, however, that this pattern is not followed by corromper, whose participle is regular (corrompido), nor by bendecir and maldecir (see table below).

Verbs with regular and irregular participles 

A number of former irregular participles, such as confuso ('confused', from confundir), poseso ('possessed', from poseer), and suspenso ('suspended, hung', from suspender), are nowadays used solely as adjectives, not as participles, and are therefore no longer considered as such.

See also 

Spanish verbs
Spanish conjugation

Spanish grammar
Spanish-language lists